Basileostylus bollonsi , common name the New Zealand flax snail or , is a species of air-breathing land snail, a terrestrial pulmonate gastropod mollusc in the family Bothriembryontidae.

Distribution
This species is endemic to the Three Kings Islands group off the northern tip of New Zealand's North Island.

Subspecies
A number of subspecies were recognised; Placostylus bollonsi arbutus and P. b. bollonsi are classified by the New Zealand Department of Conservation as being Nationally Endangered, while Placostylus bollonsi caperatus is classified as Nationally Critical.

Buckley et al. (2011) found based on molecular phylogeny research and shell morphology research, that there are no subspecies of Placostylus bollonsi.

References

 Suter, H. (1908). A new Placostylus from New Zealand. Transactions of the New Zealand Institute, 40: 340-343, pl. 25.
 Powell, A.W.B. (1948). Land Mollusca of the Three Kings Islands. Records of the Auckland Institute and Museum 3: 273–290.

Placostylus
Gastropods described in 1908
Three Kings Islands
Taxonomy articles created by Polbot